George Sibley Johns (1857–1941) was an American journalist, most notable as editor of the St. Louis Post-Dispatch.

Biography
Johns was born in St. Charles, Missouri, to John Jay Johns and Jane Amanda Durfee.  He was named after George Champlin Sibley, founder of Lindenwood College.  Johns attended Princeton University, where he met Woodrow Wilson. They remained friends for the remainder of Wilson's life.  Upon returning to St. Charles, George studied law briefly with his uncle, Theodoric McDearmon.  He and his brother, Glover Johns, started a weekly paper, the St. Charles Journal. Later, George went to work for Joseph Pulitzer at the St. Louis Post Dispatch, where he eventually became editor and was known as one of Pulitzer's "Fighting Editors".

Johns was married to Minnehaha McDearmon, with whom he had six sons, George McDearmon Johns, Horace Durfee Johns, John Hoyt Johns, Frederick Winston Johns, John Jay Johns and the poet and playwright Orrick Glenday Johns.

Works

Books
 Joseph Pulitzer: Early Life in St. Louis and His Founding and Conduct of the Post-Dispatch up to 1883
 David Laroque: a drama in four acts (St. Louis, c1987)
 Philip Henson, the Southern Union spy. The hitherto unwritten record of a hero of the War of the Rebellion (St. Louis, Nixon-Jones Print. Co., 1887)

Articles
 "Joseph Pulitzer" Missouri Historical Review, January 1931, April 1931, July 1931 (Vol. 25, Nos. 2, 3 and 4), pp. 201–218, 404–420, 563–575.

References
 Johns, Orrick and George Sibley Johns. Time of Our Lives: The Story of My Father and Myself (1937)  

1857 births
1941 deaths
Princeton University alumni
American newspaper editors
Writers from St. Louis
St. Louis Post-Dispatch people